Chinophrys wuae is a species of jumping spider, named after the collector Hai-Yin Wu. C. wuae is similar to Attulus penicillatus, and is only known from Taiwan.

References

 (2002): Five new and four newly recorded species of jumping spiders from Taiwan (Araneae: Salticidae). Zoological Studies 41(1): 1-12. PDF

Salticidae
Spiders described in 2002
Spiders of Taiwan
Endemic fauna of Taiwan